William Tulloch Jeans (1848–1907) was a British parliamentary journalist and author.

Career
Jeans was parliamentary correspondent for The Globe, and was widely known for and consulted on his knowledge of parliamentary principle.

In their 1887 review of the first volume of The Lives of Electricians, The Spectator commented that, "Jeans has treated a subject always interesting in a pleasing and graceful way".

Personal life
His wife came from Stockport. They lived in Brighton, then Tulse Hill and Clapham Park in London.

He was the father of Sir James Jeans OM FRS (1877–1946), physicist, astronomer and mathematician.

Selected publications 
The Lives of Electricians (1887, Whittaker & Co)
Creators of the Age of Steel (1884)

References

English journalists
1848 births
1907 deaths